The West Branch of the Mad River is a  stream located in the White Mountains of New Hampshire in the United States. It is a tributary of the Mad River, part of the Pemigewasset River and ultimately the Merrimack River watershed.

The West Branch rises on the northern slopes of Mount Tecumseh, and drops northeast into Thornton Gap, between Mount Tecumseh and Mount Osceola, two major summits of the White Mountains. The stream turns east, paralleled by Tripoli Road, until it encounters Osceola Brook joining from the north, then turns south into the intervale in which the village of Waterville Valley is situated. The West Branch joins the Mad River close to the center of the Waterville Valley resort.

See also

List of rivers of New Hampshire

References

Tributaries of the Merrimack River
Rivers of New Hampshire
Rivers of Grafton County, New Hampshire